Choke is the final release by hardcore band Kiss It Goodbye, released as a 7-inch single as well as a compact disc on November 2, 1999 through Revelation Records. The tracks "Choke", "Cement", and "Watching Hellraiser" were originally recorded in 1998 to be released as an EP through Sub Pop Records, however the band broke-up in September 1997 after vocalist Tim Singer left the group.

The newly recorded tracks would remain unreleased until Revelation released "Choke" and "Cement" as a 7" single. Those two tracks, along with "Watching Hellraiser" and two tracks taken from the "Preacher" 7" (which were recorded during the same sessions as She Loves Me, She Loves Me Not), would be released as a CDEP that same day.

Track listing

Personnel
Tim Singer - vocals, layout
Tom Rusnak - bass
Andre Gorms - drums
Dermain Headboy - artwork, guitar ("Choke", "Cement", and "Watching Hellraiser")
Keith Huckins - guitar ("Preacher" and "Target Practice")
Matt Bayles - engineering ("Choke", "Cement", and "Watching Hellraiser")
Billy Anderson - engineering ("Preacher" and "Target Practice")
Jeff Caudill - layout
Alan Douches - mastering

References

1999 EPs

Revelation Records EPs